SA1 can refer to the following:

 Nintendo SA1, a microprocessor by Nintendo for use in SNES game cartridges
 SA1 Swansea Waterfront, the marketing name given to the brownfield development area located in Swansea Docks, South Wales
 the Royal mail postcode prefix for central Swansea
Sonic Adventure, a video game for the Sega Dreamcast. Abbreviated as "SA1" by fans of the series. 

SA-1 may refer to:
 SA-1 Guild, the NATO name for the S-25 Berkut, the first operational surface-to-air guided missile, used by the Soviets
 SA-1 (Apollo), an Apollo-flight